The Cornerstone Television Network is a non-commercial Christian broadcast and satellite television network based in Wall, Pennsylvania, United States. Its founder was Russ Bixler. The network has 44 full-power and 57 low-power affiliate stations, 1 online affiliate station, and it is on the Glorystar satellite service.

History 
In the late 1970s, Norma Bixler claimed to have received a vision from God while visiting the Christian Broadcasting Network's headquarters in Virginia Beach, Virginia, to launch a Christian television station in Pittsburgh. Though her husband Russ was wary of the numerous hurdles to overcome to launch a full-power television station, he eventually was convinced to share in his wife's dream and pursue the vision. With the assistance of CBN's Pat Robertson, along with Loren Cunningham, and Jim Bakker, they were able to navigate the build-out and licensing issues, then pursued professional talent such as Bill Freeman, Oleen Eagle, Stan Scott, and Eleanor Clarke, and numerous volunteers to launch Christian television in Pittsburgh.

WPCB-TV, the network's first station, launched on April 15, 1979, Easter Sunday. Through the years, it purchased and launched other stations throughout Pennsylvania and Ohio before the cable and satellite age in the 90s allowed it to expand nationwide, then with the launch of the Internet, beyond the United States.

Programming 
Cornerstone Television Network broadcasts 24 hours a day, 7 days a week. Programming includes preachers, teachers, international leaders, movies, documentaries, music, and holiday specials for people of all ages.

Other notable programming includes Origins, a program on creation science and the argument against commonly accepted scientific principles; the show presents scientific evidence supporting Young Earth creationism.

List of affiliates

References

External links 
 CTVN official site
 trueGODtv Affiliate

Lists of American television network affiliates
Companies based in Allegheny County, Pennsylvania
Evangelical television networks
Television channels and stations established in 1979
1979 establishments in Pennsylvania